Axonic Informationssysteme GmbH is a privately held software developer, based in Karlsruhe, Germany that develops and markets products focused on digital communication and information.

History
Axonic was founded in 2003 by Martin Welker in Karlsruhe, Baden-Württemberg.

List of products by order of release

References

External links
Website of Axonic Informationssysteme GmbH

Software companies of Germany
Software companies established in 2003
Companies based in Baden-Württemberg
2003 establishments in Germany